The Lamaze technique, also known as the psychoprophylactic method or simply Lamaze, began as a prepared childbirth technique. As an alternative to medical intervention during childbirth, it was popularized in the 1950s by French obstetrician Dr. Fernand Lamaze and based on his observations in the Soviet Union. The goal of Lamaze is to build a mother's confidence in her ability to give birth, through classes that help pregnant women understand how to cope with pain in ways that both facilitate labor and promote comfort, including relaxation techniques, movement, and massage.

There is a training and certification program available to practitioners, leading to the Lamaze Certified Childbirth Educator (LCCE) designation.

History
Dr. Lamaze was influenced by childbirth practices in the Soviet Union, which involved breathing and relaxation techniques under the supervision of a "monitrice", or midwife. The Lamaze method gained popularity in the United States after Marjorie Karmel wrote about her experiences in her 1959 book Thank You, Dr. Lamaze, as well as Elisabeth Bing's book Six Practical Lessons for an Easier Childbirth (1960). Both Karmel and Bing would later found the American Society for Psychoprophylaxis in Obstetrics in 1960, later renamed to Lamaze International.

Practices
The core beliefs of Lamaze International are summarized in a list titled "Six Healthy Birth Practices":

 Let labor begin on its own. 
 Walk, move around and change positions throughout labor.
 Bring a loved one, friend or doula for continuous support.
 Avoid interventions that are not medically necessary.
 Avoid giving birth on your back and follow your body's urges to push.
 Keep mother and baby together – it's best for mother, baby and breastfeeding.

Each of the practices includes a video, a patient handout, and professional references for medical personnel. The Lamaze Healthy Birth Practices are available in eleven languages: English, Mandarin, Russian, Spanish, Portuguese, Czech, Polish, Romanian, Greek, Arabic, and Hebrew.

Criticism
Lamaze himself has been criticized for being over-disciplinary and anti-feminist. Natural childbirth activist Sheila Kitzinger’s description of the methods she deployed while working in a Paris clinic during the 1950s expresses concern regarding "the disciplinary nature" of Lamaze’s approach to childbirth. According to Kitzinger, Lamaze consistently ranked the women’s performance in childbirth from "excellent" to "complete failure" on the basis of their "restlessness and screams". Those who "failed" were, he thought, "themselves responsible because they harbored doubts or had not practiced sufficiently", and "intellectual" women who "asked too many questions" were considered by Lamaze to be the most "certain to fail".

The Lamaze technique has also been criticized for being ineffective.

See also
 Natural childbirth
 Lamaze International

References
Notes

External links
Official site of Lamaze International
Really Teaching Lamaze: Evidence-Based Practice
Records of Lamaze International. Schlesinger Library, Radcliffe Institute, Harvard University.
Audiotape Collection of Lamaze International. Schlesinger Library, Radcliffe Institute, Harvard University.
Moving Image Collection of Lamaze International. Schlesinger Library, Radcliffe Institute, Harvard University.

Childbirth
Natural childbirth